Yabroud or Yabrud is a city in Syria, located in the Rif Dimashq (i.e. According to the Syria Central Bureau of Statistics (CBS), Yabroud had a population of 25,891 in the 2004 census.

Etymology
The name Yabroud is said to have originated from an Aramaic word meaning "cold"; the city rests upon the Qalamoun Mountains slopes (Anti-Lebanon) at a height of 1,550 m.

History
The city is known for its ancient caves, most notably the Iskafta cave (where, in 1930, a thirty-year-old German traveller and self-taught archeologist Alfred Rust made many important pre-historical findings), which dates back to a period known as Jabroudian culture, named after Yabroud; and the Yabroud temple, which was once Jupiter Yabroudiss temple but later became "Konstantin and Helena Cathedral". Yabroud is home of the oldest church in Syria. The Natufian archeological site Yabroud III is named for the town of Yabroud.

Yabroud was mentioned in the pottery tablets of Mesopotamia in the 1st century B.C., and Ptolemy's writings in the 2nd century A.D.

In 1838, its inhabitants were  Sunni Muslim, Melkite Catholic and Greek Orthodox Christians.

During the Syrian Civil War the city was the center of the Battle of Yabroud in March 2014.

Notable people
 The parents of former President of Argentina Carlos Menem were both born in Yabroud; they emigrated to Argentina before the end of World War I.
 Antun Maqdisi (1914–2005), a Syrian philosopher, politician and human rights activist, died in Yabroud.
 Gregory Atta lived for a time in Yabroud
 Youssef Halaq (1939–2007), a Syrian writer and literary translator.
 Zaki Konsoul (1916–1994), a poet and writer.
 Khaled M. Al Baradea (1934–2008), a poet and writer.
 Asem Al Basha (born 1948), an artist and writer.
 George Haswani, Syrian-Russian businessman.
 Saeed Alnahhal, Syrian-Swedish journalist.

References

Gallery

Bibliography

Cities in Syria
Populated places in Yabroud District
Natufian sites
Emesene dynasty
Archaeological sites in Rif Dimashq Governorate
Christian communities in Syria